John Bell (1691–1780) was a Scottish doctor and traveller.

Life 
Bell was born at Antermony, near Milton of Campsie, Stirlingshire, in Scotland. He studied medicine in Glasgow, and in 1714, set out for Saint Petersburg, where, through the introduction of a fellow Scot, he was nominated medical attendant to Artemy Volynsky, recently appointed to the Persian embassy, with whom he travelled from 1715 to 1718. The next four years, he spent in an embassy to China, passing through Siberia and the great Tatar deserts. He had scarcely rested from this last journey when he was summoned to attend Peter the Great in his expedition to Derbent and the Caspian Gates. In 1738, he was sent by the Russian government on a mission to Constantinople, returning in May to Saint Petersburg.

It appears that after this he was for several years established as a merchant at Constantinople, where he married Mary Peters, a Russian lady, and returned to Scotland in 1746, where he spent the latter part of his life on his estate, enjoying the society of his friends. After a long life spent in active beneficence and philanthropic exertions, he died at Antermony on 1 July 1780, at the advanced age of 89. He is buried in Campsie Glen. His travels, published at Glasgow in 1763, were speedily translated into French and Russian, and widely circulated in Europe.

His only work is Travels from St. Petersburg in Russia to various parts of Asia 1763, in two volumes printed by Robert and Andrew Foulis of Glasgow. The Quarterly Review says that Bell wished to obtain literary help in writing his book, and applied to Robertson, who could not help him, but advised him to take Gulliver's Travels for his model. The work was based on diaries kept by Bell during his travels. Although Bell's primary purpose for travel was as medical attendant, his book is highly descriptive and, due to its wide circulation, an important contribution to travel writing about Siberia in the 18th-century.

References

Bibliography 

 
 
 

18th-century explorers
18th-century Scottish people
18th-century Scottish writers
1691 births
1780 deaths
Explorers of Siberia
People from Milton of Campsie
Scottish explorers
Scottish travel writers